Sečovce is a town in the Trebišov District in the Košice Region of south-eastern Slovakia.

History

The town was first mentioned in year 1255 on the list of king Béla IV of Hungary. In 1494, a Roman Catholic church was built in the Gothic architecture style. Since the 15th century, there was gradual development of trade, including markets with shoemakers, saddlers, potters and furriers. The first post-office was opened in 1783, telegraph office in 1868, telephone office in 1890, train station in 1904, and museum in 1954, which was moved to Trebišov in 1981.

Geography

Demographics
According to the 2001 census, it had 7,819 inhabitants - 95.89% of whom were Slovak, 2.17% Roma, 0.47% Czech, and 0.22% Hungarian. The religious makeup was 47.05% Roman Catholic, 25.71% Greek Catholic, 18.11% with no religious affiliation, and 1.83% Lutheran. Prior to 1945, the town had a large Jewish population, most of which was deported by the Nazis. Also, prior to 1945, the town consisted primarily of ethnic Hungarians, with a small Slovak minority, but the Hungarians were forceably deported right after the war in order to ethnically cleanse the area and to make room for Slovaks from the north. Those who remained have assimilated and now consider themselves for the most part to be Slovak.

Economy and facilities

The town has a pharmacy, and outpatient health facilities of a general practitioner and pediatrician. There is a public library, a cultural house and a movie theater. It also has a post office, a petrol station, a repair garage, and a number of general and food stores. It also has a Slovak commercial bank and insurance company.

A few factories reside in and around Sečovce - Palma Agro (vegetable oils), Silometal (metal silos and containers), Sonap (clothing), Valter (socks), Lesy SR (wood processing), and Simkovic-Protektor s.r.o./SPR Retreading Solutions (tire retreads)

Sport
The town has a football pitch, a gym, fitness and a sport hall.

Famous people
 Štefan Sečovský (16th century), evangelical preacher, writer, composer, pedagogue  His original Hungarian name was Galszecsi Istvan. 
 Štefan Gáboréczy (16th century), evangelical writer
 Andrej Fáy (1786 – 1864), lawyer, businessman, politician, writer, playwright
 Emery Roth (1871 – 1948), architect
 Herman Jarkovský (1898 – ?), photographer, businessman, musician (violin and cello), music teacher
 Július Muľarský (1910), politician (KSČ), warrior against fascism
 Ján Murín (1913 – 1990), theologian, Byzantine Catholic priest, religious activist, warrior against communism, victim of communism
 Ján Bavorský (1918), lawyer, university professor
 Štefan Korčmároš (1919 – 1985), historian, chronicler, writer, pedagogue, cultural activist
 Vojtech Jenčík (1920 – 1976), theologian, priest, poet, warrior against communism, victim of communism
 Jozef Švagrovský (1921 – 1985), paleontologist, university professor
 Andrej Mikloš (1924 – 2002), economist, cultural activist
 Gejza Šimanský (1924 – 2007), football player
 Mikuláš Kasarda (1925-2013), poet, pedagogue
 Dionýz Čollak (1926 – 2004), veterinary surgeon, university professor
 Ingrid Lukáčová (1969), poet
 Michal Besterci (1937), metallurgy engineer, university professor
 Ingrid Timková (1967), actress and director
 Adolf Schwarz (1836), Hungarian-Jewish chess player

References

External links
Municipal website
The History of the Jewish community in Secovce, JewishGen

Cities and towns in Slovakia
Villages and municipalities in Trebišov District
Zemplín (region)